The Political Party "Socialists" was a Ukrainian center-left political party founded in August 2014 as Political Party of Workers, Peasants, and Intelligentsia of Ukraine. In February 2015, the party adopted its current name. The party was led by Yevhen Anoprienko since 27 November 2019.

The activity of the party was terminated on 19 March 2022 by the National Security and Defense Council of Ukraine due to martial law. On 23 September 2022 after losing its final appeal at the Supreme Court of Ukraine was dismissed, the party was banned in Ukraine.

History 

Under its current name, the party was registered by the Ministry of Justice of Ukraine on January 28, 2015. Vasyl Tsushko, a veteran of the socialist movement, was elected head of the party. On May 21, 2016, he announced the resignation of his powers and resignation from the party due to another cyclical deterioration of his health.

On June 25, 2016, at the 5th congress of the party, Leonid Kozhara, the Minister of Foreign Affairs of Ukraine (2012-2014), the acting chairman of the OSCE (2013), the People's Deputy of Ukraine of the 5th-6th-7th convocations (from 2006 until 2014), was elected as the chairman of the "Socialists". On November 27, 2019, he submitted a statement to the party's congress about resigning his powers and leaving the party.

On the eve of the 2020 local elections the party announced at a joint press conference a merge with Reasonable Force, All-Ukrainian People's Union and Union of Left Forces, but this merge did not materialise.

The activity of the party was terminated on 19 March 2022 by the National Security and Defense Council of Ukraine due to martial law. On 14 June 2022 the Eighth Administrative Court of Appeal banned this party. The property of the party and all its branches were transferred to the state. The party was banned because it was seen as a collaborator with Russia. The decision was open to an appeal at the Supreme Court of Ukraine. On 23 September 2022 the final appeal against the party's ban was dismissed by the Supreme Court of Ukraine, meaning that the party was fully banned in Ukraine.

Elections

In the 2015 local elections, the party nominated candidates for regional centers and regional councils in most regions of the country, but did not get into any council.

In December 2018, the congress of "Socialists" nominated Leonid Kozhara as a candidate for the presidency.

In the 2020 local elections the party nominated candidates for the Sumy City Council.

References

External links
The website of the political party Socialists 
https://www.facebook.com/socialisty.ua  [СОЦИАЛИСТИ  в Facebook]

2014 establishments in Ukraine
2022 disestablishments in Ukraine
Banned political parties in Ukraine
Banned socialist parties
Defunct socialist parties in Ukraine
Political parties disestablished in 2022
Political parties established in 2014
Russian political parties in Ukraine
Webarchive template wayback links